Bawarchi (translation: The Chef) is a 1972 Indian Hindi musical comedy-drama film directed by Hrishikesh Mukherjee starring Rajesh Khanna and Jaya Badhuri with Asrani, A.K. Hangal, Usha Kiran and Durga Khote in supporting roles. This was a remake of Rabi Ghosh starrer Bengali film Galpo Holeo Satti (1966) by Tapan Sinha. The film was ranked the eight highest-grossing film of the year 1972. In an interview, Khanna quoted "In 'Bawarchi' I did exactly the opposite of what Hrishida had made me do in 'Anand'. He allowed me to interpret the role and perform my way. I had done enough intense roles, and 'Bawarchi' gave me the opportunity to interpret and perform the role the way I wanted. So I let myself go."

Mukherjee's style here is typical, in that the film contains no violence, and focuses rather on "the milieu of the Indian middle-class who have larger-than-life foibles and whose major concern is to survive the day [...:] which bahu will cook, which brother will use the bathroom first, who will get up first to make the morning tea, [etc.]" Khanna won his second BFJA Awards for Best Actor (Hindi) for his performance in this film.

The movie is a remake of the Bengali film Galpo Holeo Satti (1966) by Tapan Sinha. The film was remade in Tamil as Samayalkaaran with M. K. Muthu. It was remade twice in Kannada - first as Sakala Kala Vallabha, starring Shashikumar and second as No 73, Shanthi Nivasa, with Sudeep. It served as a great inspiration for the 1997 Hindi film Hero No. 1.

Synopsis
The story is centered around the squabbling Sharma family, headed by their eccentric Daduji, which has a dubious reputation of the inability to retain a cook for more than a few months due to their ill treatment of their domestic helps. The family's disrepute spreads to such an extent that no person wants to be employed as a cook in their home, named Shanti Niwas (abode of peace).

Then one day a young man named Raghu offers to work as a cook, and is hired. Raghu, however, lives up to this challenge and becomes the apple of the eye of every inmate of Shanti Niwas. He even defuses the internal squabbles and re-unites the family.

Plot

The film starts by the introduction of Shanti Niwas and its residents by Amitabh Bachchan, who is the narrator here. He points out that Shanti Niwas is a pot of ironies: Even though its name means "Home of Peace", there is no peace here. The home, which houses the Sharma family, has members who hate each other for reasons unknown. Even a servant cannot withstand the Sharmas for more than a month.

After every month, the search for a new servant has to start. Then, suddenly a servant named Raghu comes in. Even though nobody remembers asking for Raghu, they hire him. But Raghu has his own surprises in store for them. Gradually, the whole home discovers that Raghu is not only an accomplished chef, but also an expert singer and dancer.

Raghu tells his masters that he worked for reputed veterans of given fields, who taught him something or the other. Gradually, many aces start falling out of his sleeves, causing the Sharmas to develop an attraction to him. Even Daduji, the disgruntled patriarch of the family, develops love for Raghu. The family puts so much trust in Raghu that they even unwittingly show him the box containing the family jewels.

Krishna is the recluse daughter of Daduji's dead son and daughter-in-law. On learning this, Raghu tutors her and brings her talents to the fore. He also helps in clearing up the misunderstandings and calling truces between the family members. Daduji cannot help but think that Raghu is actually a saviour sent by god. Meanwhile, nobody notices that Raghu is suspiciously eyeing the jewel box the whole time.

Meanwhile, Raghu learns that Krishna loves a boy named Arun, but the Sharmas are strictly against the union of Krishna with him. The boy also loves Krishna, but is helpless before Krishna's relatives as well. Amongst all the tangle, Raghu suddenly disappears. The Sharmas are also aghast to know that the box is missing as well.

It does not take the Sharmas long to put two and two together. At the same time, Arun shows up. The people are already angered at the turn of events and the boy's arrival, but they receive a shock when he shows them the jewelry box. He explains that he saw Raghu in a suspicious condition with the box. When he asked Raghu about the box, Raghu tried to run away. He tried to stop Raghu, even beat him up (the boy is a wrestler), but Raghu somehow managed to escape.

Stunned by this unexpected turn of events, the attitude of Sharmas towards Arun changes and they agree to get him married with Krishna out of gratitude. Krishna, however, refuses to buy the story. When the Sharmas start abusing Raghu, Arun wasn't able to take it anymore and tells them what really happened.

He tells them that he met Raghu at his own wrestling ground. He had a little friendly match with Raghu, where he suffered minor injuries from Raghu. He saw the box and asked Raghu about it. Raghu said that the box was the real reason he came there. Raghu had asked him to take the box to the Sharmas and tell them that Raghu had stolen it so that Krishna's lover can get back his place in the house.

Meanwhile, Krishna sees Raghu outside the house and asks him why did he do all this. Raghu told her that his real name was professor Prabhakar, but he took the fake name of Raghu. He had seen many families like the Sharmas which were on the brink of breaking up and hence decided to use his knowledge to stop this.

Raghu explained to him that if he lies about the box and what happened between him and Raghu, the boy will be able to marry Krishna. Raghu had promised the boy to secrecy, but the latter couldn't stand up the abuse to Raghu. A stunned Sharma family has to accept that Raghu went out of his way to save several homes like Shanti Niwas. Krishna manages to stop Raghu in time from going somewhere else.

Raghu tells her that this is his life's mission and now he has to go. The film ends with a scene of him traveling to a new destination and narration from Amitabh Bachchan that "Raghu is going to a new home. Let's hope it is not yours."

The movie was a hit. It was the 8th  highest-grossing film of the year.

Cast
Rajesh Khanna as Raghunandan aka Raghu (Bawarchi) / Professor Prabhakar 
Jaya Bhaduri as Krishna Sharma
Usha Kiran as Shobha Sharma (Choti maa)
Harindranath Chattopadhyay as Shivnath Sharma (Daduji)
A. K. Hangal as Ramnath Sharma (Munna)
Durga Khote as Seeta Sharma (Badi maa)
Asrani as Vishwanath Sharma (Bubbu)
Raju Shrestha as Pintoo Baba
Kali Bannerjee as Kashi
Paintal as Dance Master (Guruji)
Seema Kapoor as Dancer #2 (Dance performance night)
Amitabh Bachchan as Narrator

Crew
Director - Hrishikesh Mukherjee
Story - Tapan Sinha
Screenplay - Hrishikesh Mukherjee
Dialogue - Gulzar
Editor - Das Dhaimade
Producer - Hrishikesh Mukherjee, N. C. Sippy, Romu N. Sippy
Cinematographer - Jaywant Pathare
Art Director - Ajit Banerjee
Animation - S. G. Naiksatam
Choreographer - Gopi Krishna
Narrator - Amitabh Bachchan

Music

Awards

|-
| 1973
| Rajesh Khanna
| BFJA Awards for Best Actor (Hindi)
| 
|-
| 1973
| Paintal
| Filmfare Best Comedian Award
| 
|}

References

External links

1972 films
Indian family films
Indian comedy-drama films
1970s Hindi-language films
Films directed by Hrishikesh Mukherjee
Films scored by Madan Mohan
Films about dysfunctional families
Hindi remakes of Bengali films
Cooking films
1972 comedy-drama films